U.C. Sampdoria continued its decline and finished in seventh position in Serie A, once again missing out on international competitions. New coach Sven-Göran Eriksson came to a squad that had lost its main striker Gianluca Vialli, but despite his absence Sampdoria scored 50 goals in 34 matches, but the defence leaked in an uncharacteristic manner for Eriksson's teams.

Squad

Transfers

Competitions

Serie A

League table

Results by round

Matches

Coppa Italia

Second round

Topscorers
  Roberto Mancini 15
  Vladimir Jugović 9
  Attilio Lombardo 6
  Eugenio Corini 4

Statistics

Players statistics

References

Sources
  RSSSF - Italy 1992/93

U.C. Sampdoria seasons
Sampdoria